The 2018 Atlantic 10 Conference women's soccer tournament was the postseason women's soccer tournament for the Atlantic 10 Conference held from October 27 through November 4, 2018. The quarterfinals of the tournament were held at campus sites, while the semifinals and final took place at Baujan Field in Dayton, Ohio. The eight-team single-elimination tournament consisted of three rounds based on seeding from regular season conference play. The defending tournament champions were the La Salle Explorers. La Salle did not qualify for the tournament after finishing ninth in conference regular season play.  The top seed, and regular season champions were the Saint Louis Billikens. Saint Louis also won their second overall title, and coach Katie Shields' first title.

Bracket

Schedule

Quarterfinals

Semifinals

Final

Statistics

Goalscorers 
4 Goals
 Maddie Pokorny - Saint Louis

2 Goals
 Ingrid Brouwer - VCU
 Morgan Bower - Saint Joseph's
 Kelly Graves - VCU
 Sofia Pavon - George Washington

1 Goal
 Jisca Adigo - George Mason
 Emily Bradshaw - George Mason
 Annabelle Copeland - Saint Louis
 Emma Farley - Saint Louis
 Hannah Friedrich - Saint Louis
 Jenny Hipp - UMass
 Samantha Jerabek - VCU
 Olivia Petit - Saint Louis
 Courtney Reimer - Saint Louis
 Lindsay Sands - Saint Louis
 Ryan Taylor - Saint Joseph's
 Emma Van Der Vorst - George Mason

Own Goals
 George Washington vs. VCU
 VCU vs. Saint Louis

See also 
 2018 Atlantic 10 Men's Soccer Tournament

References 

 
Atlantic 10 Conference Women's Soccer Tournament